Tchefuncte may refer to:

 Tchefuncte site
 Tchefuncte River
 Tchefuncte River Range Lights